Sir Godfrey Dalrymple Dalrymple-White, 1st Baronet (6 July 1866 – 1 April 1954), known as Godfrey White until 1926, was a Conservative Party politician in the United Kingdom.

Dalrymple-White was the son of General Sir Henry Dalrymple White and his second wife Alice Elizabeth (née Malcolm), and was educated at Wellington College, Berkshire, and the Royal Military College, Sandhurst. He joined the Grenadier Guards and was promoted to lieutenant on 7 February 1885, and captain on 13 February 1897. 

When the Second Boer War broke out in South Africa he went there with a battalion of his regiment in 1900, and took part in operations in the Transvaal, east of Pretoria, July–November 1900, including the battle of Belfast. In November 1900 he was present at the actions near Caledon River; then served in Orange River Colony and Cape Colony from December 1900 to May 1902. Following the end of hostilities, he left Cape Town in late June 1902 on board the SS City of Vienna, arriving at Southampton the following month. For his service during the war, he had been promoted to major on 23 July 1901, was mentioned in dispatches, and received the Queen's South Africa Medal with three clasps, and the King's South Africa Medal with two clasps. After the war he served as Station Commandant. He later served in the First World War and achieved the rank of Lieutenant-Colonel in the Grenadier Guards.

Dalrymple-White was also involved in politics and sat as Member of Parliament (MP) for Southport from January 1910 to 1923 and from 1924 to 1931. In 1926 he assumed by deed poll the additional surname of Dalrymple and the same year he was created a baronet, of High Mark in the County of Wigtown.

Dalrymple-White married, in 1912, the Hon. Catherine Mary, daughter of Byron Cary, 12th Viscount of Falkland. He died in April 1954, aged 87, and was succeeded in the baronetcy by his son, Henry.

Notes

References 
Kidd, Charles, Williamson, David (editors). Debrett's Peerage and Baronetage (1990 edition). New York: St Martin's Press, 1990, 
 

1866 births
1954 deaths
Grenadier Guards officers
British Army personnel of the Second Boer War
British Army personnel of World War I
Baronets in the Baronetage of the United Kingdom
Conservative Party (UK) MPs for English constituencies
UK MPs 1910
UK MPs 1910–1918
UK MPs 1918–1922
UK MPs 1922–1923
UK MPs 1924–1929
UK MPs 1929–1931
People educated at Wellington College, Berkshire
Graduates of the Royal Military College, Sandhurst